is a Japanese science fiction writer who won Seiun Awards for Hoshi no Pilot 2: Suiseikari, Ariel and also for three non-fiction volumes, Passport to the Universe. He also co-wrote the film Venus Wars with Yoshikazu Yasuhiko. His work Miniskirt Pirates was adapted into an anime television series in 2012.

References 

1963 births
Living people
Japanese science fiction writers